Jonestown is an unincorporated community in Van Wert County, in the U.S. state of Ohio.

History
Jonestown was founded in 1886. A large share of the first settlers having the surname Jones caused the name to be selected. A variant name was Tokio. A post office called Tokio was established in 1880, and remained in operation until 1950.

References

Unincorporated communities in Van Wert County, Ohio
Unincorporated communities in Ohio
1886 establishments in Ohio
Populated places established in 1886